The canton of Carmaux-2 Vallée du Cérou is an administrative division of the Tarn department, southern France. It was created at the French canton reorganisation which came into effect in March 2015. Its seat is in Carmaux.

It consists of the following communes:
 
Amarens
Blaye-les-Mines
Bournazel
Les Cabannes
Carmaux (partly)
Combefa
Cordes-sur-Ciel
Donnazac
Frausseilles
Itzac
Labarthe-Bleys
Labastide-Gabausse
Lacapelle-Ségalar
Laparrouquial
Livers-Cazelles
Loubers
Marnaves
Milhars
Monestiés
Montirat
Montrosier
Mouzieys-Panens
Noailles
Penne
Le Riols
Roussayrolles
Saint-Benoît-de-Carmaux
Saint-Christophe
Saint-Marcel-Campes
Saint-Martin-Laguépie
Saint-Michel-de-Vax
Salles
Le Ségur
Souel
Taïx
Tonnac
Trévien
Vaour
Vindrac-Alayrac
Virac

References

Cantons of Tarn (department)